Kwesi Appiah (born 12 August 1990) is a Ghanaian professional footballer who plays as a striker for Colchester United, on loan from  side Crawley Town and the Ghana national team.

Club career

Ebbsfleet United
Appiah was born in Camberwell, Greater London, to a Ghanaian father and an English mother. He is a product of the Ebbsfleet United PASE youth system, and graduated to the first team in August 2008. He scored his first goal for the club with his first touch after coming on as a substitute against Woking on 20 September 2008. Appiah missed training in October and after leaving the ground, he failed to report back to the club.

Peterborough United
His disappearance was explained in October, when League One team Peterborough United announced the signing of Appiah, on a three and a half-year deal. The matter was reported to The Football Association, as it was reported in breach of regulations. On 15 December it was reported that the FA had decided that the approach made for Appiah by Peterborough was "not proven" and so no ruling could be made.

Appiah was loaned out back to the Conference with Weymouth in February 2009 and made his debut in a 2–0 defeat to York City. He suffered from an ankle ligament injury that ruled him out of a game against Altrincham, but returned for the 5–0 defeat to Burton Albion. He returned to Peterborough on 20 March. He spent time at Northern Premier League Premier Division side King's Lynn in 2009, where he played 10 games scoring 9 goals, including a hat-trick against Durham City in an 11–0 win. Appiah's loan spell came to an abrupt end when the club was wound up in late-November 2009; this meant their record for 2009–10 was expunged. On 19 January 2010, he joined Kettering Town on a month-long loan.

Return to Non-League
Appiah joined Southern Football League Premier Division side Brackley Town for the 2010–11 season. Appiah then signed a two-year deal with Isthmian League Premier Division side Margate on 25 July 2011. After his great run of form this attracted a number of professional clubs and on 16 January 2012, he was linked with a move to Blackpool, when he claimed Margate had agreed a deal with the Seasiders and stated that he was due to travel to Blackpool for talks with manager, but he later rejected the move as he preferred to move to London. Appiah left Margate having scored 35 goals in 34 games for the club.

Crystal Palace
On 31 January 2012, he agreed his second professional deal to play for Crystal Palace. On 28 January 2013, Appiah joined Football League One side Yeovil Town on a month's loan deal. He made his first appearance for Yeovil in the 2–1 win over MK Dons, coming on in the second half as a substitute for Matthew Dolan.

Appiah returned to the Conference Premier on 13 September 2013 when he signed on a one-month loan deal for the then league leaders Cambridge United. Appiah scored his first Cambridge goal in a 3–0 win over Nuneaton Town on 24 September and followed it with the equaliser in a 1–1 draw away at Wrexham and the winner against Hereford United in the next two games. Having missed a penalty in a 0–0 stalemate against Chester, he atoned with both goals in the 2–0 win over Salisbury City that maintained Cambridge's six-point lead at the top of the Conference Premier on 19 October. Appiah had earlier confirmed the loan deal had been extended by a further month via his Twitter account. Appiah scored further goals against Aldershot Town, Barnet (2) and Macclesfield Town (2) in November, leading Cambridge manager Richard Money to express his eagerness to re-sign Appiah on loan in the January transfer window.

On 21 January 2014, Appiah joined Notts County on a one-month emergency loan.

On 27 March 2014, Appiah joined League Two side AFC Wimbledon on loan for the remainder of the 2013–14 season. He scored his first goal in a 2–2 draw with Newport County.

On 9 July 2014, Appiah rejoined Cambridge United on a six-month loan. Since his last stint at Cambridge, the club had regained their place in the Football League. He scored six league goals in nineteen league appearances but also scored the winner in the first round of the FA Cup against League One Fleetwood Town and a late equaliser against Mansfield Town in the second round – playing a large role in maintaining a run to the fourth round and two lucrative ties against Manchester United.

On 26 March 2015, Appiah joined Reading on loan until the end of the 2014–15 season. Appiah then injured his anterior cruciate ligament on 7 June 2015, while training for the Ghana national side  As of 26 January 2016, it was reported that he had made enough progress to soon restart light training.

On 29 March 2017, it was announced that Appiah had joined Norwegian Eliteserien club Viking on loan until the end of June.

AFC Wimbledon
He re-signed for League One side  AFC Wimbledon, this time on a permanent basis, on 31 May 2017. He scored his first goal for Wimbledon in a 2–0 win against Doncaster Rovers on 26 August 2017. He was released by AFC Wimbledon when his contract expired in June 2020.

NorthEast United
On 14 October 2020, Appiah joined Indian Super League club NorthEast United FC on a one-year deal.

Crawley Town
On 16 August 2021, Appiah joined EFL League Two club Crawley Town on a one-year deal with the option for a second.

On 1 September 2022, Appiah joined Colchester United on loan until the end of the 2022–23 season.

International career
Appiah was eligible to represent both Ghana and England. On 24 December 2014 he was called into the 31-man provisional squad for the 2015 Africa Cup of Nations by Ghana. He made his debut in Ghana's 2–1 win over South Africa on 27 January 2015 and scored his first international goal in the quarter-final victory over Guinea.

Career statistics

Club

International

Scores and results list Ghana's goal tally first, score column indicates score after each Appiah goal.

Honours
Ghana
Africa Cup of Nations runner-up: 2015

References

External links

Profile at the AFC Wimbledon website

1990 births
Living people
Footballers from Camberwell
English footballers
Citizens of Ghana through descent
Ghanaian footballers
Ghana international footballers
Association football forwards
Ebbsfleet United F.C. players
Peterborough United F.C. players
Weymouth F.C. players
King's Lynn F.C. players
Kettering Town F.C. players
Brackley Town F.C. players
Thurrock F.C. players
Margate F.C. players
Crystal Palace F.C. players
Aldershot Town F.C. players
Yeovil Town F.C. players
Cambridge United F.C. players
Notts County F.C. players
AFC Wimbledon players
Reading F.C. players
NorthEast United FC players
Crawley Town F.C. players
National League (English football) players
Isthmian League players
English Football League players
Indian Super League players
2015 Africa Cup of Nations players
English expatriate footballers
Expatriate footballers in Norway
English expatriate sportspeople in Norway
Expatriate footballers in India
English expatriate sportspeople in India
Black British sportsmen
English sportspeople of Ghanaian descent